Ryszard Czerwiec (born 28 February 1968 in Nowy Targ) is a Polish football player. Czerwiec made 28 appearances for the Poland national football team.

References

External links
 
 

1968 births
Living people
Polish footballers
Poland international footballers
Victoria Jaworzno players
Zagłębie Sosnowiec players
Widzew Łódź players
En Avant Guingamp players
Wisła Kraków players
Szczakowianka Jaworzno players
GKS Katowice players
Ligue 1 players
Ekstraklasa players
Polish expatriate footballers
Expatriate footballers in France
People from Nowy Targ
Sportspeople from Lesser Poland Voivodeship
Association football midfielders